I Wish You Love may refer to:

I Wish You Love, a song based on the Charles Trenet French song, "Que reste-t-il de nos amours?" with French lyrics by Charles Louis Trenet.  English lyrics were written by Albert Beach.  Original song artists: (French)- Roland Gerbeau, 1943 and (English)- Keely Smith with Nelson Riddle Orchestra, January, 1957. It was notably sung by Amanda Lear in her 2021 album Tuberose (Amanda Lear album).
An Evening With Marlene Dietrich, 1972 TV special originally titled I Wish You Love: Marlene Dietrich
I Wish You Love (Gloria Gaynor album), a 2002 album by Gloria Gaynor
I Wish You Love (Lionel Hampton album), an album by Lionel Hampton
I Wish You Love (Gloria Lynne album), a 1965 album by Gloria Lynne
I Wish You Love (Dean Martin album), a 1996 album by Dean Martin
I Wish You Love (Janis Siegel album), a 2002 album by Janis Siegel
I Wish You Love (Keely Smith album), a 1958 album by Keely Smith
I Wish You Love (Nancy Wilson album), a 1992 album by Nancy Wilson